"How Do You Sleep at Night" is a song written by Jim McBride and Jerry Salley, and recorded by American country music artist Wade Hayes.  It was released in July 1998 as the third single from his album When the Wrong One Loves You Right. The song reached number 13 on the Billboard Hot Country Singles & Tracks chart in November 1998.

Critical reception
Deborah Evans Price of Billboard gave the song a favorable review, writing that "with each successive release [Hayes] seems to grow more confident in his smoky baritone, and he imbues this taut single with a tense passion that perfectly suits the lyric."

Chart performance

References

1998 singles
1998 songs
Wade Hayes songs
Song recordings produced by Don Cook
Columbia Records singles
Songs written by Jerry Salley
Songs written by Jim McBride (songwriter)